Karl Ernst Rahtgens (27 August 1908 – 30 August 1944) was a German officer in the Wehrmacht during World War II, and an active resistance fighter against the Nazi régime.

Born in Lübeck, he was married to Johanna Helene Rahtgens, née von Cramon. His uncle was Field Marshal Günther von Kluge.

Rahtgens, who held the rank of oberstleutnant, was arrested in Belgrade for his involvement in the 20 July plot to assassinate Adolf Hitler. He was sentenced to death on 30 August 1944 by the Volksgerichtshof and was hanged later the same day at Plötzensee Prison in Berlin.

Sources
 Plötzensee Prison

Executed members of the 20 July plot
People from Schleswig-Holstein executed at Plötzensee Prison
German resistance members
People condemned by Nazi courts
1908 births
1944 deaths
People executed by hanging at Plötzensee Prison
Military personnel from Lübeck
German Army officers of World War II